Wu-Chung Hsiang (born 12 June 1935 in Zhejiang) is a Chinese-American mathematician, specializing in topology. Hsiang served as chairman of the Department of Mathematics at Princeton University from 1982 to 1985 and was one of the most influential topologists of the second half of the 20th century.

Biography
Hsiang hails from Wenzhou, Zhejiang. He received in 1957 his bachelor's degree from the National Taiwan University and in 1963 his Ph.D. under Norman Steenrod from Princeton University with thesis Obstructions to sectioning fibre bundles. At Yale University he became in 1962 a lecturer, in 1963 an assistant professor, and in 1968 a full professor. At Princeton University he was a full professor from 1972 until retiring in 2006 as professor emeritus and was the department chair from 1982 to 1985. He was a visiting scholar at the Institute for Advanced Study for the academic years 1965–1966, 1971–1972, and 1979–1980. He was a visiting professor at the University of Warwick in 1966, the University of Amsterdam in 1969, the University of Bonn in 1971, the University of California, Berkeley in 1976, and the Mathematical Sciences Research Institute and Stanford University in 1980.

Hsiang has made important contributions to algebraic and differential topology. Works by Hsiang, Julius Shaneson, C. T. C. Wall, Robion Kirby, Laurent Siebenmann and Andrew Casson led in the 1960s to the proof of the annulus theorem (previously known as the annulus conjecture). The annulus theorem is important in the theory of triangulation of manifolds.

With F. Thomas Farrell he worked on a program to prove the Novikov conjecture and the Borel conjecture with methods from geometric topology and gave proofs for special cases. For example, they gave a proof of the integral Novikov conjecture for compact Riemannian manifolds with non-positive sectional curvature. Hsiang also made contributions to the topological study of simply-connected 4-manifolds.

From 1967 to 1969 he was a Sloan Fellow and for the academic year 1975–1976 a Guggenheim Fellow. In 1980 he was elected a member of Academia Sinica. In 2005 there was a conference at Stanford University in honor of his 70th birthday.

His doctoral students include Ruth Charney, F. Thomas Farrell, Thomas Goodwillie, and Lowell E. Jones.

References

1935 births
Living people
20th-century American mathematicians
21st-century American mathematicians
Chinese emigrants to the United States
Topologists
Institute for Advanced Study visiting scholars
Members of Academia Sinica
National Taiwan University alumni
Yale University faculty
Princeton University faculty
University of California, Berkeley faculty
Educators from Wenzhou
Scientists from Wenzhou
Sloan Research Fellows
Mathematicians from Zhejiang